Abdoulaye Doucouré (born 1 January 1993) is a professional footballer who plays as a central midfielder for  club Everton. Born in France, Doucoure  plays for the Mali national team.

Early life
Doucouré was born in Meulan-en-Yvelines, Yvelines, to Malian parents. His cousin Ladji Doucouré is a French track and field athlete.

Club career

Rennes
Doucouré made his debut in the Ligue 1 during the 2012–2013 season for Rennes, having come through their youth system.

Watford

On 1 February 2016, Doucouré signed to Premier League club Watford for an undisclosed fee and immediately went on loan to La Liga club Granada CF on loan.
He made his first La Liga appearance one week later, when he came on as an 80th-minute substitute for Adalberto Peñaranda in a 1–2 home loss against Real Madrid. Doucouré scored his first goal for Watford on 4 March 2017, netting an injury time consolation as Watford lost 3–4 to Southampton.

Doucouré scored seven goals and made two assists in the 2017–18 season, with five goals and six assists the year after. He was named "Player of the Season" for the club at the end of the 2017–18 season.

Everton
On 8 September 2020, Premier League club Everton announced that they had signed Doucouré from Watford for an undisclosed fee believed to be in the region of £20m. He signed a three-year deal with a club option for a fourth season. Doucouré made his debut on 13 September during Everton's first game of the 2020–21 season, 1–0 win away from home against Tottenham Hotspur. Doucouré scored his first Everton goal with a powerful header in a 3–2 away win against Fulham on 22 November 2020 in a Premier League fixture. He scored again against Manchester United in a 3–3 draw on 6 February 2021 at Old Trafford when he tapped in from close range. On 12 March, Everton manager Carlo Ancelotti said that Doucouré had suffered a fractured foot in training thus ruling him out for 8–10 weeks. Ancelotti said he hoped Doucouré would return to the team before the end of the season.

International career

Doucouré played for France at U21 level. In March 2019, he was approached by the Mali FA over representing the African country at international level. He is eligible to play for Mali, the country of his origin, but rejected their approach.

In February 2020, Doucouré said in an interview that he was targeting a place in the France national team but he also remained open to represent the Mali national team. In September 2020, Doucouré was called up by Mali for upcoming matches against Ghana on 9 October and Iran on 13 October in Turkey, which he rejected due to his desire to play for France under Didier Deschamps.

In February 2022, Mali FA President Baviuex Touré told the media that he was in negotiation with Doucouré, hoping that he would switch his international allegiance from France in time to feature in their World Cup play-offs in March.

In March 2022, Doucouré finally accepted a call-up from Mali and is in line to make his international debut this month as Mali push for World Cup qualification.  He debuted with Mali in a 1–0 2022 World Cup qualification loss to Tunisia on 25 March 2022.

Style of play
Former Everton manager Carlo Ancelotti has said of Doucouré that "he can play everywhere on the pitch. He can play number 10, in behind, in front of the defence, his work defensively is really good. He is learning a lot tactically as well. He has a fantastic ability for the transition when we catch the ball. He is fantastic box-to-box."

Career statistics

Club

International

Honours
Watford
FA Cup runner-up: 2018–19

Individual
Watford Player of the Season: 2017–18

References

External links

 Profile at the Everton F.C. website
 
 

1993 births
Living people
People from Meulan-en-Yvelines
Footballers from Yvelines
Malian footballers
Mali international footballers
French footballers
France youth international footballers
France under-21 international footballers
French sportspeople of Malian descent
Association football midfielders
Stade Rennais F.C. players
Watford F.C. players
Granada CF footballers
Everton F.C. players
Championnat National 2 players
Championnat National 3 players
Ligue 1 players
La Liga players
Premier League players
Malian expatriate footballers
French expatriate footballers
Expatriate footballers in England
Expatriate footballers in Spain
Malian expatriate sportspeople in England
French expatriate sportspeople in England
French expatriate sportspeople in Spain
FA Cup Final players